Canal Clásico ( "Classical Channel") was a Spanish television channel owned and operated by Televisión Española (TVE), the television division of state-owned public broadcaster Radiotelevisión Española (RTVE). It was available via pay television platform Digital+, and previously on Cotelsat. It was known for broadcasting a range of classical music as well as dance and operas.

It was launched on 8 January 1994 and discontinued on 10 September 2010.

Programming
The channel broadcast a range of classical music as well as dance and operas. The network based its schedule on different types of programming for each day of the week:

Monday
Musical cinema and documentaries
Tuesday
Ballet and Contemporary Dance
Wednesday
Chamber music including choirs and solo performers
Thursday
Music from well known composers
Friday
Other types of music like New Age and ethic music
Saturday
Opera and large concerts
Sunday
Flamenco.

Logos and identities

External links
Official Site
Canal Clasico Program Schedule
Canal Clásico at LyngSat Address

Defunct television channels in Spain
RTVE defunct channels
Television channels and stations established in 1994
Television channels and stations disestablished in 2010
1994 establishments in Spain